Martin Damm and Leander Paes were the defending champions, but Paes chose not to participate, and only Damm competed that year.
Damm partnered with Pavel Vízner, but lost in the first round to Philipp Kohlschreiber and Mikhail Youzhny.

Tomáš Berdych and Dmitry Tursunov won in the final 7–5, 3–6, [10–7], against Philipp Kohlschreiber and Mikhail Youzhny.

Seeds

Draw

Draw

External links
2008 ABN AMRO World Tennis Tournament Main Doubles Draw

Doubles